Galaxia SM (stylized as galaxiaSM) is a South Korean sports marketing and management company under Trinity Asset Management and SM Entertainment with advertising, broadcast programming, content creation, digital marketing, event management, and production business.

History 
Established in November 2004, the company specialized in sports marketing, channels, content, and publishing rights and was listed on the KOSPI market in October 2006. The largest shareholder is Trinity Asset Management, an affiliate of the Hyosung Group, with a 22.4% stake in the company and a 37.1% stake, including affiliated parties.

On August 25, 2015, IB Worldwide, and entertainment company SM Entertainment signed a partnership through mutual investment. IB Worldwide announced through the board of directors on the same day that it had decided to raise 11.5 billion won from SM and 8.9 billion won from affiliates of Hyosung Group and changed the company name to Galaxia SM.  SM also announced a third-party capital increase of 6.5 billion won for IB Worldwide, marking the first business partnership in South Korea between a sports and entertainment company. Shim Woo-taek revealed that the two companies combined will be able to develop a variety of content and contribute to the national interest by expanding their scope to the global market. Kim Young-min stated that the partnership would be trying to pioneer a global market with a new marketing and business model through the combination of sports and entertainment. The two companies are also expecting various synergies from this strategic alliance by developing sportainment broadcasting content, merchandising businesses, body management system development, and digital marketing business through a multi-channel network (MCN).

People 
Galaxia SM supports the sponsorship contracts of the athletes and is in charge of advertising and other management. All information listed is adapted from the company's players page and content page of its official website.

Athletes

Creators 
 DocSwing Kim Jun-nyeon
 EvaYoga
 Jopro's Just Turn
 Kim Myung-seop's Fitness Class
 Long-legged Lina
 ManUTube
 Muscular Rich Arnold Hong
 The Point of Swimming
 Water Tank
 WinterPapa
 Working Out Dave
 Yang Löw

Association partners 
All sports governing bodies listed are adapted from Galaxia SM's sports marketing page of its official website.
 Korea Basketball Association
 Badminton Korea Association
 Korea Volleyball Association
 
 
 
 
 Daejeon Hana Citizen

References

External links 

 

SM Entertainment subsidiaries
Hyosung
South Korean companies established in 2004
Sports management companies